The 1961 Green Bay Packers season was their 43rd season overall and their 41st season in the National Football League. The team finished with an 11–3 record under third-year head coach Vince Lombardi, earning them a first-place finish in the Western Conference. The Packers ended the season by shutting out the New York Giants 37–0 in the NFL Championship Game, the first title game ever played in Green Bay. This was the Packers seventh NFL league championship. The 1961 Packers also featured 12 future Hall of Famers, the most on any single team in NFL history.

The 1961 season was the first in which the Packers wore their trademark capital "G" logo on their helmets.

Offseason

NFL Draft
The 1961 NFL Draft was held in late December 1960.

Green indicates a future Pro Football Hall of Fame inductee
Yellow indicates a future Pro Bowl selection

Personnel

Staff

Roster

Depth chart

Preseason

Regular season
Despite being named NFL MVP, Paul Hornung was briefly lost to the military. In response to the construction of the Berlin Wall, the Department of Defense activated thousands of reservists. Two dozen football players were activated, including Paul Hornung, Boyd Dowler, and Ray Nitschke. On November 14, Hornung was to report to Fort Riley in north central Kansas. Wisconsin residents were so upset that Republican senator Alexander Wiley and Democratic congressman Clement Zablocki requested deferments for the players. On October 18, the final word was that the players had to serve. Hornung missed the November 19 game in Green Bay against the Rams, but was flown from Fort Riley to Detroit for the November 23 Thanksgiving Day game against the Lions at Tiger Stadium. Hornung kicked a field goal and two extra points in the 17–9 victory.

Injured in late October, right guard Jerry Kramer was sidelined for the remainder of the season. Forrest Gregg moved in from right tackle to guard, and Norm Masters started at right tackle.

Schedule

Note: Intra-conference opponents are in bold text.

Season summary

Week 1: vs. Detroit

Week 2: vs. San Francisco

Week 3: vs. Chicago

Week 4: vs. Baltimore

Week 5: at Cleveland

Week 6: at Minnesota

Week 7: vs. Minnesota

Week 8: at Baltimore

Week 9: at Chicago

Week 10: vs. Los Angeles

Week 11: at Detroit

Week 12: vs. New York

Week 13: at San Francisco

Week 14: at Los Angeles

Playoffs

Game summary

1961 NFL Championship Game vs. New York

Standings

Roster

Stats

Passing

Rushing

Receiving

Kicking

Punting

Kick Return

Punt Return

Interception

Team

Awards and records
 Paul Hornung, NFL MVP
 Paul Hornung, Bert Bell Award

Milestones

References

Sportsencyclopedia.com

Green Bay Packers seasons
National Football League championship seasons
Green Bay Packers
Green